Luke 11 is the eleventh chapter of the Gospel of Luke in the New Testament of the Christian Bible. It records Luke's version of the Lord's Prayer and several parables and teachings told by Jesus Christ. The book containing this chapter is anonymous, but early Christian tradition uniformly affirmed that Luke the Evangelist composed this Gospel as well as the Acts of the Apostles.

Text
The original text was written in Koine Greek and divided into 54 verses.

Textual witnesses
Some early manuscripts containing the text of this chapter are:
 Papyrus 75 (written about AD 175-225)
 Papyrus 45 (c. 250)
 Codex Vaticanus (325-350)
 Codex Sinaiticus (330-360)
 Codex Bezae (c. 400)
 Codex Washingtonianus (c. 400)
 Codex Alexandrinus (400-440)
 Codex Ephraemi Rescriptus (c. 450)

The Lord's Prayer

The chapter opens with Jesus praying in "a certain place" and being asked by one of his disciples to teach them to pray, as John the Baptist had taught his disciples. In reply Jesus taught them the model prayer known generally as the Lord's Prayer. Writers looking at Matthew's account alongside Luke's account have argued that the disciple must have been a later recruit to Jesus' entourage and therefore not present at the Sermon on the Mount.

A friend comes at midnight

And He said to them, "Which of you shall have a friend, and go to him at midnight and say to him, 'Friend, lend me three loaves; for a friend of mine has come to me on his journey, and I have nothing to set before him'; and he will answer from within and say, 'Do not trouble me; the door is now shut, and my children are with me in bed; I cannot rise and give to you'?"

For Luke, the Lord's Prayer has a strongly eschatological focus: it prays for the coming of the Kingdom of God and maintaining that until such coming, Jesus' disciples "should live under its shadow and out of its strength". So Luke follows on from the prayer with a parable which speaks of the need for urgent and insistent prayer, portrayed through "a determined petition for bread". The parable indicates that God is not indifferent during this time of waiting, and Eric Franklin observes that any suggestion to the contrary "arises out of a misreading of the signs of the times".

Keep Asking, Seeking, Knocking
Ask, and it will be given to you 
()

The text here mirrors Luke's text at :
Give, and it will be given to you
(δίδοτε καὶ δοθήσεται ὑμῖν)

God's responsiveness to persistent prayer can be understood in the light of the parable of the friend at midnight and the persistence in seeking help which it represents.

He who does not gather with me scatters

, also .

Baptist theologian John Gill suggests that "the allusion is either to the gathering of the sheep into the fold, and the scattering of them by the wolf; or to the gathering of the wheat, and binding it in sheaves, and bringing it home in harvest; and to the scattering of the wheat loose in the field, whereby it is lost".

See also
 Jonah
 Lord's Prayer
 Ministry of Jesus
 Parable of the Strong Man
 Related Bible parts: Jonah 1; Matthew 6, 7, 12, 16, 23; Mark 3, 12; Luke 20

References

External links 
 King James Bible - Wikisource
English Translation with Parallel Latin Vulgate
Online Bible at GospelHall.org (ESV, KJV, Darby, American Standard Version, Bible in Basic English)
Multiple bible versions at Bible Gateway (NKJV, NIV, NRSV etc.)

Gospel of Luke chapters